Frigate lieutenant is a naval rank in the naval forces of several countries.

The rank of Frigate Lieutenant (officially Light Frigate Lieutenant) was a rank in the French Royal Navy until 1786. It was used by officers promoted from outside the ranks of the gardes de la marine, such as merchant navy officers, promoted volunteers or colonial gentry. The rank of Frigate Lieutenant was equivalent, but junior to, to the rank of Ship Ensign. Some Frigate Lieutenants were eventually promoted Fireship Captains, equivalent to Ship-of-the-Line Lieutenants.

Gallery

References

Naval ranks